Johnny Parker was a rugby league footballer in the Australian competition, the New South Wales Rugby League.

Playing career
Parker played eleven matches for Eastern Suburbs club in the years 1936 & '41. although not playing in the final series for the Tricolours that year, Parker was a member of the East's side that went unbeaten in winning the 1936 premiership.

Parker also had one season playing for South Sydney in 1940, he played just the one match.

References

Sources
 The Encyclopedia Of Rugby League; Alan Whiticker & Glen Hudson

Year of birth missing
Possibly living people
Australian rugby league players
Sydney Roosters players
Place of birth missing (living people)
South Sydney Rabbitohs players
Rugby league centres
Rugby league fullbacks